Frank Stanley Reasoner (16 September 1937 – 12 July 1965) was a United States Marine Corps officer who was awarded the Medal of Honor posthumously for his heroic actions above and beyond the call of duty in 1965 during the Vietnam War.

Biography
Reasoner was born in Spokane, Washington in September 1937. He moved with his parents to Kellogg, Idaho, in 1948, and graduated from Kellogg High School in June 1955. He enlisted in the U.S. Marine Corps three months before his 18th birthday.

He completed recruit training at the San Diego Recruit Depot in August, and was promoted to private first class. He then went to and completed infantry training at Camp Pendleton, California. He was designated an Airborne Radio Operator in 1956 upon completing Airman School, Naval Air Technical Training Center, Jacksonville, Florida, and the Communication Electronics School at San Diego. He was next assigned to Marine Wing Service Group 37, 3rd Marine Aircraft Wing, El Toro, California, and while there was promoted to corporal. He was transferred to the Naval Academy Preparatory School at United States Naval Training Center Bainbridge, Maryland in 1957, then served as a guard at Marine Barracks, Annapolis, Maryland.

In January 1958, he was promoted to sergeant prior to receiving Congressional appointment to the U.S. Naval Academy, sponsored by U.S. Senator Henry Dworshak of Idaho. Successfully completing the Academy's entrance examinations in June 1958, Sgt. Reasoner was transferred to the inactive Marine Corps Reserve and enrolled as a midshipman. While at the Naval Academy, he lettered in baseball, knitting and wrestling, and won four straight Brigade boxing championships in four different weight classes. Upon graduation, 6 June 1962, he was awarded a Bachelor of Science degree and returned to the Marine Corps as a second lieutenant.

Reasoner was promoted to first lieutenant in December, and completed Officers Basic School at Marine Corps Schools, Quantico, Virginia, in January 1963. He then embarked for a three-year tour of duty with the Fleet Marine Force in the Pacific area. During his entire overseas tour, he served with the 3rd Reconnaissance Battalion. Assigned initially to the 1st Marine Brigade, at Kāne'ohe Bay, Hawaii, he served with Company B, 3rd Reconnaissance Battalion, 4th Marines, and moved with his organization to Vietnam in April 1965. On 20 June 1965, he was designated Commanding Officer, Company A, 3rd Reconnaissance Battalion, 3rd Marine Division (Reinforced).

On 12 July 1965, Reasoner was leading an 18-man patrol from Company A near Đại Lộc, approximately 18 km southwest of Danang, when it was attacked by a company-sized Vietcong force. Reasoner was killed and 3 other Marines were wounded in the engagement.

 was named after Reasoner.

The 3rd Reconnaissance Battalion base camp at Hill 327, Danang, South Vietnam was named "Camp Reasoner" and dedicated to his memory. The hand-lettered sign near the gates of Camp Reasoner read: "…First Lieutenant Reasoner sacrificed his life to save one of his wounded Marines. 'Greater Love Hath No Man'." (See  for "Greater love..." quote.)

Military awards
Reasoner's military decorations and awards include:

Medal of Honor citation
The President of the United States, in the name of The Congress takes pride in presenting
the MEDAL OF HONOR posthumously to

for service as set forth in the following

Citation:

See also

List of Medal of Honor recipients
List of Medal of Honor recipients for the Vietnam War

References

Further reading
Vetter, Larry. Never Without Heroes: Marine Third Reconnaissance Battalion in Vietnam, 1965–70, Ivy Books – "Chapter 2, The Reasoner Patrol," pages 17–26.

External links

 Frank S. Reasoner on The Wall of Faces of the Vietnam Veterans Memorial Fund website.

1937 births
1965 deaths
Military personnel from Spokane, Washington
United States Marine Corps Medal of Honor recipients
People from Kellogg, Idaho
United States Marine Corps officers
United States Military Academy alumni
American military personnel killed in the Vietnam War
Vietnam War recipients of the Medal of Honor
United States Marine Corps personnel of the Vietnam War